The 1974 NCAA Division III Men's Soccer Championship was the second annual tournament held by the NCAA to determine the top men's Division III college soccer program in the United States.

The semifinals and final were played at the State University of New York at Brockport in Brockport, New York.

Babson defeated defending champions and hosts Brockport in the final, 1–0, to claim their first Division III national title.

Bracket

Final

See also
 1975 NCAA Division I Soccer Tournament
 1975 NCAA Division II Soccer Championship
 1975 NAIA Soccer Championship

References 

NCAA
NCAA Division III Men's Soccer Championship
NCAA Division II Soccer Championship